Clara Fuentes Monasterio (born 12 August 1997) is a Venezuelan Paralympic powerlifter. She won bronze in the women's 41 kg at the 2020 Summer Paralympics held in Tokyo, Japan. A few months later, she won the silver medal in her event at the 2021 World Para Powerlifting Championships held in Tbilisi, Georgia.

References

External links
 

Living people
1997 births
Powerlifters at the 2020 Summer Paralympics
Medalists at the 2020 Summer Paralympics
Paralympic powerlifters of Venezuela
Paralympic medalists in powerlifting
Paralympic bronze medalists for Venezuela
Place of birth missing (living people)
21st-century Venezuelan women